Frank Wells was a businessman.

Frank Wells may also refer to:

Frank Wells (cricketer) (1871–1932), New Zealand cricketer
Frank Wells (footballer) (1909–1993), Australian rules footballer

See also
Frank Wels (1909–1982), Dutch football forward
Frankie Wells (disambiguation)